Metkaouak is a town in north-eastern Algeria. 

Communes of Batna Province